Tandem Diabetes Care is an American medical device manufacturer based in San Diego, California. The company develops medical technologies for the treatment of diabetes and specifically insulin infusion therapy.

History

In 2006, a group of engineers recognized the need for new and improved methods of pumping insulin and incorporated as Phluid, Inc. In 2007, Kim Blickenstaff joined the organization as President and CEO, bringing his philosophy of using market research as the inspiration for product development and started on the development of the t:slim Insulin Pump. In 2008, this predecessor company became the newly incorporated Tandem Diabetes Care, Inc. that was formed with a focus on promoting a comprehensive, user-centric, and integrated approach to diabetes product development and customer care. Tandem Diabetes Care felt that incorporating enhanced ease of use and attractive design—often associated with consumer electronics development—would also encourage more patients to consider the clinical benefits of insulin pump therapy. Tandem Diabetes Care interviewed more than 4,000 insulin pump users and health care providers to design its first device, the t:slim Insulin Pump.

In 2016, the company was ranked #39 on the Deloitte Fast 500 North America list.

In 2018, the company was recognized as a top workplace in San Diego by the San Diego Union-Tribune.
 
In February 2019, the company announced that CEO Kim Blickenstaff would transition to a newly-created position of Executive Chairman of the Board of Directors. John F. Sheridan (previously COO) will succeed Mr. Blickenstaff, assuming the role of President and CEO effective March 1, 2019.

Products

In November 2011, the company received FDA clearance to market the t:slim Insulin Pump, the first ever touch-screen insulin pump. In February 2013, the company received FDA clearance to market the t:connect Diabetes Management Application, a Mac and PC-compatible data management application that provides t:slim Pump users and their healthcare providers a way to display data from the pump and supported blood glucose meters on a cloud-based platform. In January 2015, Tandem announced FDA clearance of the t:flex Insulin Pump, which was the largest capacity insulin pump on the market. In July 2014, Tandem announced that it had submitted a PMA for the t:slim G4 insulin pump, which integrated t:slim Pump technology with the Dexcom G4 Platinum CGM System. This device was approved by the FDA in September 2015. The FDA approved a tool to update the software on Tandem's pumps in July 2016. The Tandem Device Updater would be used to deliver all software updates to Tandem's pumps moving forward and that the first use of the new tool will be to update t:slim pumps which were shipped prior to April 2015 with a new version of the firmware which speeds the loading process and offers other enhancements. In late October 2016, Tandem began shipping its next-generation pump platform, the t:slim X2.

In August 2017, Tandem launched its t:lock Connector. In the same month, it announced the launch of the t:slim X2 Insulin Pump with Dexcom G5 Mobile CGM. In July 2018, the company launched its first automated insulin delivery (AID) algorithm, with the t:slim X2 Insulin Pump with Basal-IQ predictive low glucose suspend Technology[17] and in February 2019, the FDA classified the t:slim X2 insulin pump as the first in a new device category called Alternate Controller Enabled Infusion Pumps (ACE pumps).

The t:slim X2 pump will continue to receive updates via the Tandem Device Updater, with a planned update including the Control-IQ hybrid closed-loop algorithm (licensed from TypeZero in July 2016) available beginning in January 2020.

References

External links
 

Companies based in San Diego
Companies listed on the Nasdaq
Medical device manufacturers
Medical technology companies of the United States